WLIW-FM (88.3 FM) is a radio station  licensed to Southampton, New York and serving eastern Long Island and coastal Connecticut. Owned by The WNET Group, it is a sister station to PBS member television station WLIW, and features programming from American Public Media, NPR and Public Radio Exchange. The station also broadcasts in HD.

It is the only NPR station on Long Island (population about 8 million). It is one of three public radio stations broadcast to eastern Long Island. The other stations are Connecticut-based Connecticut Public Radio, WSHU-FM and WSUF, which access the market via repeater stations.

In addition to its to NPR programming, local programs include jazz, rhythm and blues, world music and music from Broadway theater, as well as "Heart of the East End" with Gianna Volpe, "The Afternoon Ramble" with Brian Cosgrove and "The Urban Jazz Experience" with Ed German.

History

Southampton College (1978–2010)
The original station was a carrier current station, WSCR, housed in a Southampton College dormitory suite, and run as a student club. Construction of a new stereo FM station began in the basement of Southampton Hall by 1978. The antenna tower was raised in January 1980, and the station went on the air, still as a club and funded by student activity fees, as WPBX at 91.3 MHz on March 11, 1980. The original power output of the FM transmitter was ten watts. 

WPBX was completely student-run, with Freeform programming, and largely ignored by the administration, until 1981-82 when the administration imposed some control and installed Joseph Valerio to run the station. Valerio arranged to carry Texaco's Metropolitan Opera radio broadcasts and programming began evolving toward an NPR-style format. In February 2002, the station changed to a jazz format. On July 6, 2002, the station changed its call sign to WLIU, reflecting its ownership by Long Island University (LIU). In April 2004, the station changed to a news format.

Peconic Public Broadcasting (2010–2020)
The station broadcast from the second floor of Chancellors Hall on the campus of Stony Brook Southampton until the spring of 2010. The State University of New York at Stony Brook had taken over the LIU campus (previously named Southampton College) in 2006. At the time of the takeover, an agreement was made to permit the station to continue to broadcast from the school through 2009 and that it could continue to use the tower on the campus through 2024.

The transfer of ownership of the station from Long Island University to Peconic Public Broadcasting was completed on December 15, 2010, and the call-letters changed to WPPB to reflect this. The studios were moved to Hill St. in Southampton village after Peconic Public Broadcasting took ownership.

The acquisition was led by Wallace A. "Wally" Smith who was station manager of WLIU. Smith was station manager of KUSC when it converted from an all rock station to a classical music station in Los Angeles, and was president of that radio station until 1996 (Smith's wife Bonnie Grice was an on air announcer at both KUSC and WPPB. She left WPPB for Sag Harbor radio station WLNG shortly before the announcement of the sale to WNET). The grassroots effort had included Alec Baldwin, Joy Behar and Jann Wenner. The package for the acquisition was $2.7 million ($1.35 million in cash; picking up $400,000 in transition operating costs; and maintaining WCWP radio station for one year at LIU's parent C.W. Post campus—estimated at $1 million).

The WNET Group (2020–present)
On October 24, 2019, it was announced that WNET would acquire WPPB for nearly $1 million, making it a sister to its Long Island PBS member station WLIW. WNET's purchase was consummated on March 18, 2020, at a final price of $944,834. On June 15, 2020, the station rebranded and changed its calls to WLIW-FM, adding more national NPR programming to its lineup.

References

External links
 

LIW-FM
NPR member stations
Mass media in Suffolk County, New York
Southampton (town), New York
Radio stations established in 1980
1980 establishments in New York (state)